The Judo competition in the 1994 Goodwill Games were held in Saint Petersburg, Russia 26 July 1994.

Medal overview

Men's events

Women's events

Medals table

External links
Result of the Judo at the 1994 Goodwill Games (Goodwill Games)

1994 Goodwill Games
1994
Goodwill Games
Judo competitions in Russia